Elachista jaeckhi is a moth of the family Elachistidae first described by Ernst Christian Traugott-Olsen in 1990. It is found in the former Yugoslavia.

References

jaeckhi
Moths described in 1990
Moths of Europe